Belmont Heights is a district in the south-east portion of the city of Long Beach, California, United States, bordering the Pacific Ocean and the more commercial community of Belmont Shore. The district commemorates the old City of Belmont Heights, which was incorporated in 1908 and annexed to Long Beach in 1909.  Belmont Heights' borders are Ocean Boulevard and Livingston Drive to the south, Redondo Avenue on the west, 7th Street to the North, and Nieto Avenue to the east. The area is mostly residential, but also has an active business district, the strip of Broadway east of Redondo Avenue.

History
The Belmont Heights Historic District includes homes between 7th Street on the north, 4th Street on the south, Newport Avenue on the west and Roswell Avenue on the east. A few properties located on 4th and 7th streets are included. The neighborhood was first subdivided and developed in the 1900s (decade). The oldest homes surviving today date from 1905. The predominant architectural style in the district is the Craftsman bungalow. Out of 304 homes surveyed, 206 are "contributing" Craftsman bungalows, and 125 of these are pristine unaltered examples. Other architectural styles found in the area that are considered contributing are Victorian, Mediterranean and Spanish Colonial Revival, Tudor Revival and Neo-Traditional. The period of architectural significance for the district is 1905–39. Construction peaked in 1922. Most homes are single-family, with some duplexes and a few apartment houses. Thirty-seven of the homes surveyed were ranked as "noncontributing", or 13 percent. The district commemorates the old City of Belmont Heights, which was incorporated in 1908 and annexed to Long Beach in 1909.

Interesting Facts

 Belmont Heights was incorporated as a city for one year before it annexed with Long Beach in 1909. Long Beach at the time was a dry town, so residents looking for alcohol would head over to the Heights for a drink at one of the taverns.
 The Green Long Beach Festival was created after several activists shared ideas at the Viento y Agua Coffee Shop in Belmont Heights.
 Feral Parrots A notable feature of Belmont Heights is its large population of feral parrots. In between Redondo Avenue and Livingston Drive along Ocean Blvd, amongst the palm trees, this large population of birds can be seen and heard by people for many houses. Some consider these animals to be a nuisance due to their rather vocal and loud sounds.  However, the residents of Belmont Heights have grown to accept them as part of their community.

Notable residents
 Clippers President Andy Roeser. He moved from the Valley in Tarzana to 104 Quincy in Belmont Shore and six years later moved to Belmont Heights. "I said to my wife, `This is where I want to live. It has everything I want - the ocean, the restaurants, the shops.'" He's a member of the Long Beach Yacht Club and the Belmont Athletic Club. He can also be seen kite-boarding near Claremont and Ocean.
 Former Los Angeles Rams player Marlin McKeever. He was a two-time All-American at USC and 13-year pro. He died in 2006.
 Author and screenwriter Obie Scott Wade. His production company, ObieCo Entertainment, Inc. is located in the historically significant Elizabethan Studio designed by noted architect Joseph H. Roberts.

Notable landmarks
 Belmont Veterans Memorial Pier
 Eliot Lane In 2003 residents on the street sought historic designation to protect the look of the 30 homes. The movement was started by homeowner Linda Becker Babiak whose family owned a "Spanish eclectic" home on Eliot Lane since 1925. The homes are still small - 600 to 900 square feet - and there are seven versions of the popular Spanish Revival or Craftsman Bungalow homes in the tract, all built in 1923 by Boland & Smith. For most of the street's life it was called "Eliot Court" because it was designed to be pedestrian and intimate in scale.
 Brown's Court Apartments Located at 3615-3623 E. Colorado Street, it was built as a Spanish Bungalow Court in 1923. It was awarded a Long Beach Heritage Preservation Award in 2015.
 Long Beach Green Belt path

Local Schools

The following schools are part of the Long Beach Unified School District.

Elementary Schools
John C. Fremont Elementary School, 4000 East 4th Street
Lowell Elementary School, 5201 East Broadway
Horace Mann Elementary School, 257 Coronado Avenue
Middle Schools
Jefferson Leadership Academies, 750 Euclid Avenue
Will Rogers Middle School, 365 Monrovia Avenue
High School
Woodrow Wilson Classical High School, 4400 E. 10th Street

See also
Neighborhoods of Long Beach, California

References 

Neighborhoods in Long Beach, California
Former municipalities in California